Harri Hermanni Holkeri (6 January 1937 – 7 August 2011) was a Finnish statesman representing the National Coalition Party of Finland (Kokoomus / Samlingspartiet). He was the Prime Minister of Finland 1987–1991, president of the UN General Assembly 2000–2001 and headed the United Nations Interim Administration Mission in Kosovo from 2003 to 2004 (leaving the position in the spring of the second year because of health issues).

Domestic offices
Harri Holkeri was member of the board of directors of the Bank of Finland from 1978 to 1997, and candidate in the president elections of 1982 and 1988. He also served as a member of Parliament from 1970 to 1978 and as the chairman of the National Coalition (Conservative) Party from 1971 to 1979. On 1 July 1991 he made the world's first official GSM call, to Kaarina Suonio, vice mayor of the city of Tampere.  The historic call used Nokia gear on GSM's original 900 MHz band.

Legacy
He chaired the United Nations General Assembly during the 55th session (2000–2001). He also played a constructive role in securing the Good Friday Agreement in Northern Ireland.

Cabinets
 Holkeri Cabinet

Later years and death 
In his last years, Holkeri resided in Kruununhaka, Helsinki, where on a November day in 2008 he was walking outside a grocery store, when a robber tackled him while fleeing. Holkeri was badly wounded, broke his hip and needed a joint replacement surgery on his hips. The suspect turned himself in to the police, but stated that he did not intend to harm Holkeri and that the tackle was an accident. Holkeri sued the suspect for temporary and permanent damages for a total of €8,400.

Holkeri died in 2011 in Helsinki.

Honors and awards

Domestic
Holkeri was awarded the highest Finnish honorary title of Counselor of State in 1998 by the President of Finland Martti Ahtisaari.

Foreign
Holkeri's efforts in Northern Ireland were rewarded with an honorary KBE from Queen Elizabeth II of the United Kingdom.

References

1937 births
2011 deaths
People from Oripää
National Coalition Party politicians
Prime Ministers of Finland
Members of the Parliament of Finland (1970–72)
Members of the Parliament of Finland (1972–75)
Members of the Parliament of Finland (1975–79)
Presidents of the United Nations General Assembly
United Nations Mission in Kosovo
Central bankers
Honorary Knights Commander of the Order of the British Empire
Special Representatives of the Secretary-General of the United Nations